The 1999 Texas Rangers season saw the Texas Rangers finish first in the American League West division with a record of 95 wins and 67 losses, registering the best winning percentage (.586) in franchise history until 2011.

Winning their third division title in four years, the Rangers repeated their 1998 postseason performance, again being swept by the New York Yankees in three games.  This was the Rangers' last postseason appearance until 2010.

Offseason
 December 10, 1998: Mark Clark was signed as a free agent by the Rangers.
 December 23, 1998: Gregg Zaun was sent to the Rangers by the Florida Marlins as part of a conditional deal.
 March 30, 1999: Rafael Bournigal was signed as a free agent by the Rangers.

Regular season

Opening day starters

Iván Rodríguez, C
Lee Stevens, 1B
Luis Alicea, 2B
Todd Zeile, 3B
Royce Clayton, SS
Rusty Greer, LF
Tom Goodwin, CF
Juan González, RF
Rafael Palmeiro, DH
Rick Helling, RHP

Season standings

Record vs. opponents

Notable transactions
 April 27, 1999: Rafael Bournigal was purchased from the Rangers by the Seattle Mariners.
 June 2, 1999: 1999 Major League Baseball Draft
Hank Blalock was drafted by the Rangers in the 3rd round. Player signed June 4, 1999.
Aaron Harang was drafted by the Rangers in the 6th round. Player signed June 7, 1999.

Roster

Player stats

Batting

Starters by position
Note: Pos = Position; G = Games played; AB = At bats; H = Hits; Avg. = Batting average; HR = Home runs; RBI = Runs batted in

Other batters
Note: G = Games played; AB = At bats; H = Hits; Avg. = Batting average; HR = Home runs; RBI = Runs batted in

Starting pitchers 
Note: G = Games pitched; IP = Innings pitched; W = Wins; L = Losses; ERA = Earned run average; SO = Strikeouts

Other pitchers 
Note: G = Games pitched; IP = Innings pitched; W = Wins; L = Losses; ERA = Earned run average; SO = Strikeouts

Relief pitchers 
Note: G = Games; W = Wins; L = Losses; SV = Saves; ERA = Earned run average; SO = Strikeouts

ALDS

Game 1 @ Yankee Stadium: Yankees 8, Rangers 0
Game 2 @ Yankee Stadium: Yankees 3, Rangers 1
Game 3 @ The Ballpark in Arlington: Yankees 3, Rangers 0

Awards and honors
Rafael Palmeiro, 1B, AL Gold Glove
Rafael Palmeiro, 1B, Silver Slugger Award
Iván Rodríguez, AL MVP
Iván Rodríguez, C, Gold Glove
Iván Rodríguez, Silver Slugger Award
All-Star Game

Farm system

References

1999 Texas Rangers team page at Baseball Reference
1999 Texas Rangers team page at www.baseball-almanac.com

Texas Rangers seasons
American League West champion seasons
Texas Rangers season
Range